The Palast Orchester (literal translation, Palace Orchestra) is a German orchestra, based in Berlin, constituted in the manner of dance bands of the 1920s and 1930s.  Its repertoire specialises in cabaret and popular songs of the Weimar period in Germany and in American popular songs of the same era.  The orchestra performs around 120 concerts per year.

History
Max Raabe founded the orchestra with fellow students at the Berlin University of the Arts in 1985.  The ensemble initially used music arrangements that Raabe found whilst shopping at various flea markets.  The orchestra worked for one year on learning these arrangements without any public engagements or performances.  The orchestra gave its first public performance at the 1987 Berlin Theaterball, in the lobby as a secondary act, but with such success that the audience left the ballroom to hear the orchestra's performance in the lobby.  The ensemble had its first song hit 5 years later, an original song by Raabe, "Kein Schwein ruft mich an".

The members of the orchestra are all men, with the single exception of the violinist, who has always been female.  The violinists who have served with the Palast Orchester have included:
 Michaela Hüttich (1986–1998)
 Emily Bowman (1998–2000)
 Hanne Berger (2001–2007)
 Cecilia Crisafulli (2007–present)

The current full roster of the orchestra is:

The performances by the orchestra are an homage to composers of the Weimar era such as Walter Jurmann, Fritz Rotter, Will Meisel, Charles Amberg, Jerzy Petersburski, Günter Schwenn, Adolf Steimel and Ralph Maria Siegel. In addition to its performances of vintage German and American popular songs, the orchestra has also performed contemporary music in the same musical style as the earlier songs, including covers of songs by Britney Spears, Tom Jones, and Salt'n'Pepa.

The orchestra made its Carnegie Hall debut in 2005.  The ensemble returned to Carnegie Hall in November 2007, and the performance was recorded for commercial release on the album Heute Nacht oder nie – Live In New York.  The orchestra returned to Carnegie Hall in March 2014.  The orchestra has collaborated with musicians such as HK Gruber, Peter Lohmeyer, and Heino Ferch.  In other media, the orchestra appeared in the 1994 film Der bewegte Mann.

Discography

 MTV Unplugged (2019, Deutsche Grammophon GmbH, Berlin)

Videography

References

External links
 Official Palast Orchester German-language homepage
 Opus3 Artists agency page
 Goethe Institute page on Max Raabe
 "Max Raabe's Palast Orchester: Timeless Elegance".  All Things Considered (National Public Radio), 19 October 2008.
 Chicago Symphony Orchestra page on Max Raabe
 Jason Victor Serinus, "The Musical Paradox of Max Raabe – An Interview".  Playbill Arts, 2 February 2010

German orchestras
Musical groups established in 1985
1985 establishments in Germany